Gav Koshak (also Romanized as Gāv Koshak; also known as Gāv Koshak-e ‘Olyā and Gāv Kushak) is a village in Dasht-e Barm Rural District, Kuhmareh District, Kazerun County, Fars Province, Iran. At the 2006 census, its population was 580, in 151 families.

References 

Populated places in Kazerun County